Volbrecht Nagel (1867–1921) was a German missionary to the Malabar coast of India. Initially associated with the Evangelical Lutheran Church, he later joined the Open Brethren, and is remembered now as a pioneer of the Kerala Brethren movement.

Life
Volbrecht Nagel was born on 3 November 1867 in Florstadt-Stammheim (belonging to the German federal state of Hesse). He grew up in a religious family, but lost his parents at a young age. At the age of 18, Nagel claimed to have been born again after hearing the gospel from a cobbler turned itinerant preacher. With a desire to be a missionary, he moved to Basel, Switzerland, joined the Basel Mission Training Institute in 1886 and graduated in 1892. He was ordained in the Evangelical Lutheran Mission in 1893.

Nagel came to Cannanore on the Malabar Coast as a Reverend in December 1893. He became the head of the Basel Mission center in Vaniankulam. The burden of running the schools and the small-scale industries of the Basel Mission in Vaniankulam became a stumbling block in his goal of independent ministry. In 1896, he left the Lutheran Church and Vaniankulam and went south without an aim. On his trip, he saw a prayer center in Kunnamkulam and met Paramel Itoop, a new believer. He decided to start his work at Kunnamkulam, an ancient bastion of Christianity in India.

To be part of the local community, he learned Malayalam. The community in Kunnamkulam received him as one of their own, as he wrote and spoke in Malayalam. In April 1897, he married Harriet Mitchell, an Anglo-Indian who was a teacher at Kunnamkulam. They had five sons and two daughters. One son and one daughter died in early childhood. Harriet Nagel died on 27 January 1935.

A few months after their marriage, they went to the Nilgiris and met the English Open Brethren Missionary Handley Bird. The following June, Nagel was baptized by immersion by Bird at Coimbatore. In 1906, he started an orphanage and a home for widows at Nellikunnu near Thrissur City named Rehoboth, which still stands today.

In 1914, Nagel traveled back to his native Germany. His plan was to send his older children to England for education and return to India in six months, but the beginning of World War I prevented his return. As a national of the German Empire, he could not enter British-administered Malabar, so he moved to Switzerland. Harriet and three children were back in Malabar Coast, while the two older children were in England. The letter he sent to the assembly fellowship in Paravur in 1917 reflects the hunger in his heart for souls in Malabar. That letter contained the following words: “My sweetest treasures are in India. My heart belongs there". But his desire was not fulfilled. He suffered from palsy and became bedridden. While teaching at Wiedenest Bible School, Nagel had a stroke and died on 12 May 1921 and was buried there. Harriet had been able to reach Germany and take care of him.

Writings
In 1898, Nagel wrote a book called Christian Baptism. He wrote many songs and hymns in Malayalam that are sung even today by all Christian denominations. Nagel is regarded with great esteem by the Malayalee Christian community for all his work in bringing the Gospel to Kerala.

Malayalam hymns
Nagel's mother tongue was German. He became fluent in Malayalam and composed hymns in that language, which are still used in church services.

A few of the hymns in Malayalam and their translations in English are given below:
 Snehathin Idayanam Yesuway; Wazhium sathyaum  mathremay (Jesus, the loving shepherd, you are the only way and the truth)
 Ninnodu Praarthyppan Priya Pithaway (Our dear father, we are coming for prayer) – Prayer song
 Jayam jayam Kollum Naam, Jayam Kollum Naam (Victorious, victorious, we will be victorious) – Victory song
 Deivathinte æka putren paapikale rakshippan (God's only son died on the cross to save the sinners) – Christ's passion and death
 Maranam jayicha veera (Hero that won over death) – Resurrection
 Yesu varum vegathil – Aswaasamay (Jesus will be coming soon) – Second Coming
 Ente Jeevanam Yesuway (Jesus, my life) – Comfort
 En Yesu En Sangeetham (My song shall be of Jesus)
 Samayamam rathathil njaan swargayatra cheyyunu (I am traveling towards heaven on the chariot of time) – included by music director G. Devarajan in the 1970 movie Aranazhika Neram; since the time it was sung during Sathyan's funeral in June 1971 it has become the most popular song at funerals

Nagel's translations include:
 Papakadam theerkuvan (What can wash away my sins, by Robert Lowry)
 Yeshu enn swanatham, Hallelujah (Blessed Assurance, by Fanny Crosby)
 Yeshuvin thirupadathil irunnu kelka naam (Sing them over again to me, by Philip Bliss)
 Kristhuvinte daanam ethra maduram (Like a river glorious, by Frances Ridley Havergal)
 Yeshuvil en thozhane kande (I have found a friend in Jesus, by Charles William Fry

See also
Hermann Gundert
Johann Ernst Hanxleden

References

Bibliography
Mahakavi K. V. Simon: Workers. in: History of the Malankara Brethren Churches (Malankarayilae Verpadu Sabhakalude Charithram). Tiruvalla, Kerala, India: Sathyam Publications, 1999, pp. 336–341 (first published in 1938).
T. E. Easow: Brethren Prasthanam Logamegum (in Malayalam). 1981.
W. T. Stunt et al.: Turning the World Upside Down. A Century of Missionary Endeavour. Bath, Somerset: Echoes of Service, 1972.

1867 births
1921 deaths
Protestant missionaries in India
German Plymouth Brethren
German expatriates in India
People from Wetteraukreis
Malayalam-language writers
Clergy from Hesse
German Lutheran missionaries
Lutheran missionaries in India